Sergio Villarreal Lozano (born 10 January 2000) is a Mexican professional footballer who plays as a right-back for Liga de Expansión MX club Raya2, on loan from Monterrey.

Career statistics

Club

References

External links
 
 
 

Living people
2000 births
Association football defenders
C.F. Monterrey players
Liga de Expansión MX players
Liga MX players
Mexico youth international footballers
Footballers from Nuevo León
Sportspeople from Monterrey
Raya2 Expansión players
Mexican footballers